"42" is a song by British rock band Coldplay. It was written by all members of the band for their fourth album, Viva la Vida or Death and All His Friends (2008). The song, divided into three parts, does not have a chorus. The first part is a ballad with piano and strings, which then transforms into an uptempo rock arrangement with a guitar solo. Finally, the song ends with a multi-instrumental part. A live version of "42" was featured on the band's 2009 live album, LeftRightLeftRightLeft.

Writing, composition and meaning
The song is distinctive for Coldplay as it has no chorus and is divided into three parts. In a track-by-track analysis, guitarist Jonny Buckland revealed, "We've been trying for about two years now to record a song that didn't have any chorus and didn't really have any verses... and '42' was the only time we were able to do it successfully." Frontman Chris Martin added, "Although every time we tried we've called it 42, that's about the ninth '42'" Martin also said, in an interview for MTV, that the track was called 42 because it was his "favorite number". Buckland used an ostrich tuning in this song, tuning his guitar to F-F-F-f-f-f.

Credits and Personnel 
 Chris Martin – lead vocals, acoustic guitar, piano, keyboards
 Guy Berryman – bass guitar, backing vocals
 Jonny Buckland – electric guitar, backing vocals
 Will Champion – drums, percussion, backing vocals

Additional Personnel
 Brian Eno – sonic landscapes
 Davide Rossi – strings

Charts and certifications

Charts

Certifications

References

2008 songs
Coldplay songs
Song recordings produced by Brian Eno
Song recordings produced by Jon Hopkins
Song recordings produced by Markus Dravs
Song recordings produced by Rik Simpson
Songs written by Guy Berryman
Songs written by Jonny Buckland
Songs written by Will Champion
Songs written by Chris Martin